Liskovac can refer to:

 Liskovac (Cazin), village in Bosnia and Herzegovina
 Liskovac (Gradiška), village in Bosnia and Herzegovina
 Liškovac, mountain in Serbia